The 1998 San Francisco Board of Supervisors elections occurred on November 3, 1998. Five of the eleven seats were contested. Five incumbents, two of which were appointed by Mayor Willie Brown, were up for election.

This election was the last using at-large seats, a system that effectively reduces representation of minority points of view. Subsequent Board of Supervisors elections were to district seats through a plan ratified by the voters in 1996.

Municipal elections in California are officially non-partisan, though most candidates in San Francisco do receive funding and support from various political parties.


Results 
Each voter is allowed to cast at most five votes.

External links 
City and County of San Francisco Department of Elections

San Francisco Board of Supervisors
Board of Supervisors 1998
Elections Board of Supervisors
San Francisco Board of Supervisors
San Francisco Board of Supervisors election